The Primetime Emmy Award for Outstanding Technical Direction, Camerawork, Video Control for a Special is awarded to one television special each year.

In the following list, the first titles listed in gold are the winners; those not in gold are nominees, which are listed in alphabetical order. The years given are those in which the ceremonies took place.

Winners and nominees

1970s

1980s

1990s

2000s

2010s

2020s

Notes

References

External links
 Academy of Television Arts and Sciences website

Technical Direction, Camerawork, Video Control for a Special